is a Japanese video game designer, director, and producer at Nintendo. Nogami is well-known as the creator of the Animal Crossing and Splatoon series.

Biography
Nogami was born in Yawata, Kyoto Prefecture in 1971. He graduated from the Design Department in the Osaka University of Arts during April 1994 and joined Japanese video game company Nintendo within the same year, becoming an artist for Super Mario World 2: Yoshi's Island on the Super Nintendo Entertainment System. Several years later, Nogami went on to produce the Animal Crossing series, Splatoon series, and directed development of the Wii's Mii Channel among other things. In June 2019, after years being Manager of his own group of development at Nintendo, he was promoted to the position of Deputy General Manager within the company's Entertainment Planning & Development division.

Works

References

1971 births
Japanese video game designers
Living people
Nintendo people
Osaka University of Arts alumni
People from Kyoto Prefecture
Splatoon
Japanese video game producers